The 1930–31 season was Galatasaray SK's 27th in existence and the club's 20th consecutive season in the Istanbul Football League.

Squad statistics

Competitions

Istanbul Football League

Standings

Results summary

Results by round

Matches
Kick-off listed in local time (EEST)

Friendly Matches

İstanbul Shield Final Match

References
 Futbol vol.2, Galatasaray. Tercüman Spor Ansiklopedisi.(1981) (page 602)
 Erdoğan Arıpınar; Tevfik Ünsi Artun, Cem Atabeyoğlu, Nurhan Aydın, Ergun Hiçyılmaz, Haluk San, Orhan Vedat Sevinçli, Vala Somalı (June 1992). Türk Futbol Tarihi (1904-1991) vol.1, Page(47), Türkiye Futbol Federasyonu Yayınları.
 Atabeyoğlu, Cem. 1453-1991 Türk Spor Tarihi Ansiklopedisi. page(111, 114, 116).(1991) An Grafik Basın Sanayi ve Ticaret AŞ
 Tekil, Süleyman. Dünden bugüne Galatasaray(1983). Page(159-160, 177-178). Arset Matbaacılık Kol.Şti.

External links
 Galatasaray Sports Club Official Website 
 Turkish Football Federation - Galatasaray A.Ş. 
 uefa.com - Galatasaray AŞ

Galatasaray S.K. (football) seasons
Turkish football clubs 1930–31 season
1930s in Istanbul